Kevin Thornton may refer to:

 Kevin Thornton (chef), Irish Michelin starred chef
 Kevin Thornton (footballer) (born 1986), Irish footballer
 Kevin Thornton, member of the band Color Me Badd